Daniel Škvor is a Czech mixed martial artist, kickboxer and boxer, currently competing in the light heavyweight division of Oktagon. He is a former kickboxing world champion, having held the WAKO Pro Super Heavyweight K-1 World Championship in 2017.

Kickboxing career

Early career
Škvor was scheduled to face Radim Kušnirak at Enfusion Series on December 30, 2011. He won the fight by a first-round technical knockout.

Škvor was scheduled to face Tomasz Sarara at Battles of The Dragons 6 on April 21, 2012. He lost the fight by a second-round technical knockout. Škvor rebounded from his loss to Sarara with a decision victory against Jakub Hučko at Noc Bojovníku Chrudim on December 1, 2012.

He was scheduled to face Piotr Sebastian Lepich at Simply The Best 4 on May 24, 2014. He won by a first-round knockout. He furthermore beat Kiana Bomolo by a first-round technical knockout at Noc válečníků 9 on November 12, 2014, and Piotr Ramankevich by unanimous decision at Heroes Gate 14 on April 10, 2015.

Škvor was scheduled to face Antonio Plazibat at FFC 19 - Linz on September 18, 2015. He lost the fight by a second-round technical knockout.

In early 2016, Škvor returned to the Czech-based promotion Heroes Gate. He was scheduled to face Andrija Lekic at Heroes Gate 16 on March 18, 2016, and won the fight by unanimous decision. Škvor was afterwards scheduled to face Adnan Rezovič at Heroes Gate 17 on October 27, 2016. He won by unanimous decision. These two victories with the promotion earned him the right to fight David Vinš for the Heroes Gate World Championship -98 kg title at Heroes Gate 18: Final Fight on February 24, 2017. He won the fight by unanimous decision, after an extra round was fought.

Škvor was scheduled to face Stefan Andjelkovic for the WAKO Pro World K-1 Super Heavyweight Championship at Yangames on September 30, 2017. He won the fight by a third-round technical knockout.

Glory
Škvor was scheduled to make his Glory debut against Tomáš Možný at Glory 51: Rotterdam on March 3, 2018. Mozny won the fight by unanimous decision.

Briefly moving away from Glory, Škvor was scheduled to defend his WAKO Pro title against Roman Kryklia at Monte-Carlo Fighting Trophy on June 30, 2018. Kryklia won the fight by a second-round knockout.

Škvor was scheduled to face the K-1 heavyweight champion Roel Mannaart at Glory 59: Amsterdam on September 29, 2018. Mannaart won the fight by unanimous decision.

Škvor was scheduled to face D'Angelo Marshall at Glory 64: Strasbourg on March 9, 2019. Marshall won the fight by a third-round knockout.

Škvor was scheduled to face Levi Kuyken The Heroes Gate 23 on December 19, 2019. He won the fight by a second-round knockout.

Mixed martial arts career

Oktagon MMA
Škvor made his mixed martial arts debut against Oumar Sy at Oktagon 20 on December 30, 2020. He lost the fight by a second-round rear-naked choke.

Škvor was scheduled to face Ilya Lupinov at Oktagon 26 on July 24, 2021. He won the fight by a first-round technical knockout.

Škvor faced Jhonathan Azevedo at Oktagon 30	on 30 December 2021. He won the fight by a first-round technical knockout.

Škvor was booked to face Pavol Langer at Oktagon 32 on April 9, 2022. He won the fight by unanimous decision.

Škvor faced Panagiotis Stroumpoulis at Oktagon 34 on July 23, 2022. He won the fight by a first-round technical knockout.

Škvor faced Jorick Montagnac at Oktagon 38 on December 30, 2022. He lost the fight by technical knockout, just 38 seconds into the opening round.

Championships and accomplishments
World Association of Kickboxing Organizations
2017 WAKO Pro Super Heavyweight (94.2 kg) K-1 World Championship
Heroes Gate
2017 Heroes Gate World Heavyweight (+98 kg) Championship

Fight record

Mixed martial arts record

|-
|Loss
|align=center|5–2
|Jorick Montagnac
|TKO (punches)
|Oktagon 38
|
|align=center|1
|align=center|0:38
|Prague, Czech Republic
|
|-
|Win
|align=center|5–1
|Panagiotis Stroumpoulis
|TKO (knee and punches)
|Oktagon 34
|
|align=center|1
|align=center|0:49
|Prague, Czech Republic
|
|-
|Win
|align=center|4–1
|Pavol Langer
|Decision (unanimous)
|Oktagon 32
|
|align=center|3
|align=center|5:00
|Ostrava, Czech Republic
|
|-
|Win
|align=center|3–1
|Jhonathan Azevedo
|TKO (punches)
|Oktagon 30
|
|align=center|1
|align=center|5:00
|Prague, Czech Republic
|
|-
|Win
|align=center|2–1
|Martin Horsky
|TKO (punches)
|Heroes Gate 24
|
|align=center|1
|align=center|1:05
|Prague, Czech Republic
|
|-
|Win
|align=center|1–1
|Ilya Lupinov
|TKO (punches)
|Oktagon 26
|
|align=center|1
|align=center|1:24
|Prague, Czech Republic
|
|-
|Loss
|align=center|0–1
|Oumar Sy
|Submission (rear-naked choke)
|Oktagon 20
|
|align=center|2
|align=center|4:35
|Brno, Czech Republic
|
|-

Kickboxing record

|-  style="background:#cfc;"
| 2019-12-19 || Win ||align=left| Levi Kuyken|| Heroes Gate 23 || Prague, Czech Republic || KO || 2 || 
|-
|-  style="background:#fbb;"
| 2019-07-25 || Loss ||align=left| David Vinš || Yangames Fight Night Žluté lázně, Tournament Finals || Prague, Czech Republic || KO (Left hook) || 1 || 
|-
! style=background:white colspan=9 |
|- 
|-  style="background:#cfc;"
| 2019-07-25 || Win ||align=left| Michal Turinsky || Yangames Fight Night Žluté lázně, Tournament Semifinals || Prague, Czech Republic || Decision (Unanimous) || 3 || 3:00 
|-
|-  style="background:#cfc;"
| 2019-07-25 || Win ||align=left| Thomas Froschauer || Yangames Fight Night Žluté lázně, Tournament Quarterfinals || Prague, Czech Republic || TKO (Corner stoppage) || 3 || 
|-
|-  style="background:#cfc;"
| 2019-05-24 || Win ||align=left| David Vicena || Heroes Gate 22 || Prague, Czech Republic || KO || 1 || 
|-
|-  style="background:#fbb;"
| 2019-03-09 || Loss ||align=left| D'Angelo Marshall || Glory 64: Strasbourg || Strasbourg, France || KO || 3 || 1:43
|-
|-  style="background:#fbb;"
| 2018-09-29 || Loss ||align=left| Roel Mannaart || Glory 59: Amsterdam || Amsterdam, Netherlands || Decision (Unanimous) || 3 || 3:00
|-
|-  style="background:#fbb;"
| 2018-06-30 || Loss ||align=left| Roman Kryklia || Monte-Carlo Fighting Trophy || Monaco || KO || 2 || 
|-
! style=background:white colspan=9 |
|- 
|-  style="background:#fbb;"
| 2018-03-03 || Loss ||align=left| Tomáš Možný || Glory 51: Rotterdam || Rotterdam, Netherlands || Decision (Unanimous) || 3 || 3:00
|-
|-  style="background:#cfc;"
| 2017-09-30 || Win ||align=left| Stefan Andjelkovic || Yangames  || Prague, Czech Republic || TKO || 3 || 
|-
! style=background:white colspan=9 |
|- 
|-  style="background:#cfc;"
| 2017-02-24 || Win ||align=left| David Vinš || Heroes Gate 18: Final Fight || Prague, Czech Republic || Ext. R. Decision || 4 || 3:00
|-
! style=background:white colspan=9 |
|- 
|-  style="background:#cfc;"
| 2016-12-30 || Win ||align=left| Ahmed Krnjić || Box Lucerna  || Prague, Czech Republic || KO (Uppercut) || 1 || 
|-
|-  style="background:#cfc;"
| 2016-10-27 || Win ||align=left| Adnan Rezovič || Heroes Gate 17 || Prague, Czech Republic || Decision (Unanimous) || 3 || 3:00
|-
|-  style="background:#cfc;"
| 2016-07-28 || Win ||align=left| Igor Mihaljević || Yangame's Fight Night 2016 || Prague, Czech Republic || TKO || 1 || 
|-
|-  style="background:#cfc;"
| 2016-03-18 || Win ||align=left| Andrija Lekic || Heroes Gate 16 || Prague, Czech Republic || Decision (Unanimous) || 3 || 3:00
|-
|-  style="background:#cfc;"
| 2015-12-19 || Win ||align=left| Patrik Zdrojewsky || Večer bojovníků thajského boxu Jesenice || Prague, Czech Republic || Decision (Unanimous) || 3 || 3:00
|-
|-  style="background:#cfc;"
| 2015-10-23 || Win ||align=left| Jiří Havránek || Heroes Gate 15 || Prague, Czech Republic || TKO || 3 || 
|-
|-  style="background:#fbb;"
| 2015-09-18 || Loss ||align=left| Antonio Plazibat || FFC 19 - Linz || Linz, Austria || TKO (Three Knockdowns) || 2 || 2:42
|-
|-  style="background:#cfc;"
| 2015-04-10 || Win ||align=left| Piotr Ramankevich  || Heroes Gate 14 || Prague, Czech Republic || Decision (Unanimous) || 3 || 3:00
|-
|-  style="background:#cfc;"
| 2014-11-12 || Win ||align=left| Kiana Bomolo || Noc válečníků 9 || Kladno, Czech Republic || TKO (Retirement) || 1 || 3:00
|-
|-  style="background:#cfc;"
| 2014-05-24 || Win ||align=left| Piotr Sebastian Lepich || Simply The Best 4 || Prague, Czech Republic || KO (Uppercut) || 1 || 
|-
|-  style="background:#cfc;"
| 2013-05-19 || Win ||align=left| Manuel Smoljan || Heroes Gate 10 || Prague, Czech Republic || TKO (Referee stoppage) || 3 || 
|-
|-  style="background:#cfc;"
| 2012-12-01 || Win ||align=left| Jakub Hučko || Noc Bojovníku Chrudim || Prague, Czech Republic || Decision (Unanimous) || 3 || 3:00
|-
|-  style="background:#fbb;"
| 2012-04-21 || Loss ||align=left| Tomasz Sarara || Battles of The Dragons 6 || Pomiechówek, Poland || TKO (Punches) || 2 || 2:42
|-  style="background:#cfc;"
| 2011-12-30 || Win ||align=left| Radim Kušnirak || Enfusion Series || Prague, Czech Republic || TKO (Three knockdowns) || 1 || 1:39
|-
|-  style="background:#cfc;"
| 2011-06-30 || Win ||align=left| Petr Kareš || Superliga Sasazu || Prague, Czech Republic || ||  || 
|-
| colspan=9 | Legend:

Boxing record

|-
|2
|Win
|2–0
|style="text-align:left;"| Piotr Rzyman
|TKO 
|1 (6), 
|
|24 May 2019
|style="text-align:left;"| 
|-
|1
|Win
|1–0
|style="text-align:left;"| Petr Frohlich
|RTD
|1 (4)
|
|30 Dec 2018
|style="text-align:left;"| 
|-
| colspan=10 | Legend:

See also
 List of male kickboxers

References

1989 births
Living people
Czech male kickboxers
Heavyweight kickboxers
Glory kickboxers
Czech male boxers
Czech male mixed martial artists
Mixed martial artists utilizing kickboxing
Mixed martial artists utilizing boxing
Sportspeople from Prague